The 2018 New Brunswick Scotties Tournament of Hearts, the provincial women's curling championship of New Brunswick was held January 4 to 7 at Curl Moncton in Moncton.  The winning team, the Sylvie Robichaud rink from Moncton represented New Brunswick at the 2018 Scotties Tournament of Hearts in Penticton, British Columbia.

Teams
The teams are listed as follows:

Round-robin standings

Round-robin results
All draw times are listed in Atlantic Time (UTC−03:00).

Draw 1
Thursday, January 4, 1:00 pm

Draw 2
Friday, January 5, 1:00 pm

Draw 3
Friday, January 5, 7:00 pm

Draw 4
Saturday, January 6, 9:00 am

Draw 5
Saturday, January 6, 2:30 pm

Tiebreaker
Saturday, January 6, 7:00 pm

Playoffs

Semifinal
Sunday, January 7, 9:00 am

Final
Sunday, January 7, 2:00 pm

References

2018 in New Brunswick
New Brunswick
January 2018 sports events in Canada
Curling competitions in Moncton